Lunana: A Yak in the Classroom is a 2019 Bhutanese drama film directed by Pawo Choyning Dorji in his feature directorial debut. The film had its world premiere at the BFI London Film Festival. It was a nominee for Best International Feature Film at the 94th Academy Awards.

Plot
Ugyen has completed four of his five mandatory years of training as a teacher for the government. However, he does not enjoy teaching and wishes to move to Australia to become a singer. When he is assigned to teach in the remote mountain village of Lunana, he considers quitting his job, but his grandmother urges him to complete his teaching assignment. He decides to take it and leaves the city.
Ugyen meets Michen, a village guide who leads him up the perilous path to Lunana. The villagers are excited by his arrival, but Ugyen, appalled by the poor conditions of the village, admits regret at coming and asks to be taken back. Asha, the village leader, informs him that the mules need time to rest and he can take Ugyen back in a few days. The next morning, Ugyen is awoken by Pem Zam, the class captain, who tells him the children are waiting for him in the classroom. Ugyen is taken aback by their affection for him, as the children believe teachers have the ability to “guide one to the right path.” He decides to stay and teach for the remainder of the year.

Ugyen returns the next day better prepared to teach, and improvises a solution to the lack of a blackboard by writing directly on the wall with charcoal. Michen later constructs a makeshift blackboard for him. Ugyen slowly makes improvements to the classroom, including sacrificing the paper covering his windows when the children run out of writing material. He quickly becomes a favorite of the children, performing songs on his guitar and teaching them math, English and Dzongkha. They are sad when they learn that Ugyen plans to leave when winter comes and will not return.

Ugyen later meets Saldon, the niece of Asha, as she sings a traditional song atop a hillside. She tells him that she sings it daily as an offering to the village, and he asks her to teach it to him; they meet daily and he slowly learns how to sing it himself. She says it is called Yak Lebi Lhadar, and it was written by a local yak herder who lamented having to slaughter his favorite yak for the good of the village. Saldon later gifts Ugyen with a yak, Norbu, so that he can use its dung to start fires. Because of the cold, Ugyen must keep Norbu in the classroom and he becomes a fixture of the children’s lessons.

Asha approaches Ugyen with news that winter is approaching and it is time for him to leave before the pass is covered in snow. He asks Ugyen to come back the following spring, but Ugyen says that he intends to leave Bhutan for good, disappointing him. He breaks the news to Saldon, reassuring her that a better teacher will come in the spring, but Saldon says that only the children can be the judges of that and they all love Ugyen. She hopes he will come back someday and perform Yak Lebi Lhadar for her.

Ugyen leaves Lunana after a heartfelt goodbye from the villagers. Pem Zam gives him a letter from all the children, and Saldon gifts him with a scarf. Asha sings Yak Lebi Lhadar as he departs, and Michen informs Ugyen that Asha originally wrote the song. Ugyen later reads the letter from the children, thanking him and calling him their favorite teacher while urging him to return in the spring. On the way down the mountain, Ugyen stops at a shrine and leaves an offering for safe passage, saying that he hopes to return.

Ugyen travels to Australia where he performs in a bar, but nobody pays attention to him. He stops playing his song and sings Yak Lebi Lhadar to a rapt audience.

Accolades 
The film won the Audience Choice Award for Best Feature Film and the Best of the Fest at the 2020 Palm Springs International Film Festival. At the 26th Film Festival della Lessinia in Italy, the film was awarded the Lessinia d'Oro Award for Best Film of the festival, the Giuria Microcosmo del carcere di Verona Award and a Special Mention in the Log to Green Award. At the Festival international du film de Saint-Jean-de-Luz, in Saint-Jean-de-Luz, France, the film won the Prix du Public, and Sherab Dorji was awarded the Best Actor award for his role of Ugyen Dorji.

It was selected as the Bhutanese entry for the Best International Feature Film at the 93rd Academy Awards, but it was later disqualified. However, it was resubmitted as Bhutan's entry for the following year, being shortlisted in December 2021, and being one of the five nominees competing at the 94th Academy Awards, making it the country's first Oscar-nominated film.

Cast
 Sherab Dorji as Ugyen Dorji
 Ugyen Norbu Lhendup as Michen
 Kelden Lhamo Gurung as Saldon
 Kunzang Wangdi as Asha Jinpa
 Tshering Dorji as Singye
 Sonam Tashi as Tandin
 Pem Zam as Pem Zam
 Tsheri Zom as Ugyen's grandmother

See also
 List of submissions to the 93rd Academy Awards for Best International Feature Film
 List of submissions to the 94th Academy Awards for Best International Feature Film
 List of Bhutanese submissions for the Academy Award for Best International Feature Film

References

External links
 
 
 
 

2019 films
2019 drama films
Bhutanese drama films
Dzongkha-language films
Films about educators
Films about guitars and guitarists
Films about immigration
Films about music and musicians
Films about singers
Films set in schools
Films set in the Himalayas
Films set in Bhutan
Films set in Sydney
Films shot in Bhutan
Films shot in Sydney